Kilimani is an administrative ward in the Dodoma Urban district of the Dodoma Region of Tanzania. In 2016 the Tanzania National Bureau of Statistics report there were 7,033 people in the ward, from 7,237 in 2012.

References

Wards of Dodoma Region